Halcon or Halcones, may refer to:

People
 Pequeño Halcón (aka Rogelio Espinoza López), Mexican masked wrestler
 Super Halcón Jr. (born 1987), Mexican masked wrestler
 El Halcón (born 1947, as José Luis Melchor Ortiz), Mexican masked wrestler

Places
 Mount Halcon, a mountain in the Philippines

Military
 CASA C-202 Halcón, transport aircraft used by the Spanish Air Force
 Fábrica de Armas Halcón, Argentinian defense company
 Halcón M-1943, submachine gun manufactured by the company
 Halcón ML-57, submachine gun manufactured by the company
 Halcón ML-63, submachine gun manufactured by the company
 Halcones, Chilean air force aerobatic display team
 Los Halcones, a Mexican paramilitary group that perpetrated the 1971 massacre El Halconazo

Sports
 Halcones FC, in Huehuetenango, Guatemala; a soccer team
 Halcones de Morelos, in Cuernavaca, Morelos, Mexico; a soccer team
 Halcones de Querétaro, Santiago de Querétaro, México; a soccer team
 Halcones de Xalapa, Veracruz, Mexico; a basketball team

Technology
 Halcon process, a method to make propylene oxide

Other uses
 Hal-Con, an annual fan convention held in Halifax, Nova Scotia, Canada

See also

Halcones Rojos Veracruz, Mexico; a basketball team